Heavy Metal is a 1981 Canadian adult animated science fantasy anthology film directed by Gerald Potterton, produced by Ivan Reitman and Leonard Mogel, who also was the publisher of Heavy Metal magazine, which was the basis for the film. It starred the voices of Rodger Bumpass, Jackie Burroughs, John Candy, Joe Flaherty, Don Francks, Martin Lavut, Marilyn Lightstone, Eugene Levy, Alice Playten, Harold Ramis, Percy Rodriguez, Susan Roman, Richard Romanus, August Schellenberg, John Vernon, and Zal Yanovsky. The screenplay was written by Daniel Goldberg and Len Blum.

The film is an anthology of various science fiction and fantasy stories tied together by a single theme of an evil force that is "the sum of all evils". It was adapted from Heavy Metal magazine and original stories in the same spirit. Like the magazine, the film features a great deal of graphic violence, sexuality, and nudity. Its production was expedited by having several animation houses working simultaneously on different segments. Despite receiving mixed reviews by film critics on its initial release, the film was a modest success at the box office and has since achieved cult status. The film's influential soundtrack was packaged by music manager Irving Azoff and included several popular rock bands and artists, including Black Sabbath, Blue Öyster Cult, Sammy Hagar, Don Felder, Cheap Trick, DEVO, Journey, and Nazareth, among others.

A sequel titled Heavy Metal 2000 was released in 2000.

Plot

"Soft Landing"
Based on the comic of the same name by Dan O'Bannon and Thomas Warkentin.

The title sequence story opens with a Space Shuttle orbiting the Earth. The bay doors open, releasing a 1960 Corvette. An astronaut seated in the car then begins descending through Earth's atmosphere, landing in a desert canyon.

Crew
 Jimmy T. Murakami and John Bruno – directors
 John Coates – producer
 Dan O'Bannon – writer
 Thomas Warkentin – art direction

Music
 "Radar Rider" by Riggs

"Grimaldi"
In the framing story, the astronaut Grimaldi arrives at home, where he is greeted by his daughter. He says he has something to show her. When he opens his case, a green, crystalline sphere rises out and melts him. It introduces itself to the terrified girl as "the sum of all evils". Looking into the orb known as the Loc-Nar, the girl sees how it has influenced societies throughout time and space. At the end of the film (the Epilogue), the anthology's theme comes full-circle back to the girl's home.

Cast
 Percy Rodriguez (uncredited) as Loc-Nar
 Don Francks as Grimaldi
 Caroline Semple as Girl

Crew
 Harold Whitaker – director
 John Halas – producer

"Harry Canyon"
Original story by Daniel Goldberg and Len Blum; based on The Long Tomorrow by Moebius.

In a dystopian and crime-ridden New York City in 2031, cynical taxicab driver Harry Canyon narrates his day in film noir style, grumbling about his fares and frequent robbery attempts he thwarts with a disintegrator installed in the back of his seat. He stumbles into an incident where he rescues a sexy young woman from Rudnick, a gangster who murdered her father. She explains that her father discovered the Loc-Nar, and they have been pursued relentlessly by people attempting to obtain it. Harry takes her to his apartment, where they have sex. She decides to sell the Loc-Nar to Rudnick and split the money with Harry. Rudnick is disintegrated by the Loc-Nar at the exchange, and she attempts to double-cross Harry to keep the money for herself. When she pulls out a gun, Harry uses the disintegrator on her. He keeps the money, and summarizes the incident as a "two-day ride with one hell of a tip".

Cast

 Percy Rodriguez (uncredited) as Loc-Nar
 Harvey Atkin as Alien, Henchman
 John Candy as Desk Sergeant
 Marilyn Lightstone as Whore
 Susan Roman as Girl, Satellite
 Richard Romanus as Harry Canyon
 Al Waxman as Rudnick

Crew

 Pino van Lamsweerde – director
 W. H. Stevens Jr. – producer
 Vic Atkinson – producer
 Daniel Goldberg – writer
 Len Blum – writer

Music
 "Veteran of the Psychic Wars" by Blue Öyster Cult
 "True Companion" by Donald Fagen
 "Blue Lamp" by Stevie Nicks
 "Open Arms" by Journey
 "Heartbeat" by Riggs

"Den"
Based on the character of the same name created by Richard Corben.

A nerdy teenager finds a "green meteorite" near his house and adds it to his rock collection. During a lightning experiment, the orb hurls the young man into the world of Neverwhere, where he transforms into a naked, muscular man called Den, an acronym for his earth name, David Ellis Norman. There, Den witnesses a strange ritual, rescuing a beautiful young woman who is about to be sacrificed to Uhluhtc. Reaching safety, she introduces herself as Katherine Wells from the British colony of Gibraltar. The two start having sex, but are interrupted by the minions of Ard, an immortal man who wants to obtain the Loc-Nar for himself. After being taken to see Ard, Den demands to see Katherine. His request is ignored and Ard orders his men to castrate Den. Den fights off the soldiers and shoots Ard, who is immortal and heals immediately. The girl turns out to be sleeping, encased in glass under a spell where only Ard can awaken her. Ard offers Den a deal: if he gets the Loc-Nar from the Queen and brings it to him, the girl will be released. Den agrees and infiltrates the palace along with Ard's best soldier, Norl. They are promptly caught by the Queen's guards, but she offers leniency if Den has sex with her. He complies, thereby distracting the Queen while the raiding party steals the Loc-Nar. Den escapes and races back to rescue Katherine from Ard. Recreating the lightning incident that drew him to Neverwhere, he is able to banish Ard and the Queen. Den suspects that they were teleported to Earth. Refusing the opportunity to take the Loc-Nar for himself, Den rides with Katherine into the sunset, content to remain in Neverwhere. As for the Loc-Nar, it rises into the sky and lands on a space station where it is picked up by someone else.

Cast
 Percy Rodriguez (uncredited) as Loc-Nar
 John Candy as Den
 Jackie Burroughs as Katherine Wells
 Martin Lavut as Ard
 Marilyn Lightstone as Queen
 August Schellenberg as Norl

Crew
 Jack Stokes – director
 Jerry Hibbert – producer
 Richard Corben – writer

"Captain Sternn"
Based on the character of the same name created by Bernie Wrightson.

On a space station, crooked space captain Lincoln F. Sternn is on trial for numerous serious charges presented by the prosecutor consisting of 12 counts of murder in the first degree, 14 counts of armed theft of Federation property, 22 counts of piracy in high space, 18 counts of fraud, 37 counts of rape — and one moving violation. Pleading "not guilty" against the advice of his lawyer Charlie, Sternn explains that he expects to be acquitted because he bribed a witness named Hanover Fiste. Fiste takes the stand upon being called to by the prosecutor, but his perjury is subverted when the Loc-Nar, now the size of a marble, causes him to blurt out highly incriminating statements about Sternn (though whether or not any of them are true is unknown) before changing him into a hulking muscular brute that chases Sternn throughout the station, breaking through bulkheads and wreaking havoc. Eventually, he corners Sternn, who gives him his promised payoff, and he promptly shrinks back to his scrawny original form. Sternn opens a trap door under Fiste, ejecting him into space. The Loc-Nar enters Earth's atmosphere with Fiste's flaming severed hand still clinging to it.

Cast
 Percy Rodriguez (uncredited) as Loc-Nar
 Rodger Bumpass as Hanover Fiste
 Joe Flaherty as Charlie, the lawyer
 Douglas Kenney as Regolian
 Eugene Levy as Captain Lincoln F. Sternn
 John Vernon as Prosecutor

Crew
 Julian Harris – director
 Paul Sebella – director
 Bernie Wrightson – writer

Music
 "Reach Out" by Cheap Trick

"Neverwhere Land"
Because of time constraints, a segment called "Neverwhere Land", which would have connected "Captain Sternn" to "B-17", was cut.

The story follows the influence of the Loc-Nar upon the evolution of a planet, from the Loc-Nar landing in a body of water, influencing the rise of the industrial age, and a world war. This original story was created by Cornelius Cole III.

The original rough animatics are set to a loop of the beginning of Pink Floyd's "Time". The 1996 VHS release included this segment at the end of the tape. On the DVD release, this segment is included as a bonus feature. In both released versions, the sequence is set to the music of "Passacaglia" (from Magnificat), composed and conducted by Krzysztof Penderecki.

"B-17"
A World War II B-17 bomber nicknamed the Pacific Pearl makes a difficult bombing run with heavy damage and casualties. As the bomber limps home, the co-pilot goes back to check on the crew. Finding nothing but dead bodies, he notices the Loc-Nar trailing the plane. Informing the pilot, he heads back to the cockpit, when the Loc-Nar rams itself into the plane and reanimates the dead crew members as zombies. The co-pilot is killed, while the pilot parachutes away in time. He lands on an island where he finds a graveyard of airplanes from various times, along with the wrecked airplanes' zombified airmen, who surround him, sealing the horrified pilot's fate.

Cast
 Percy Rodriguez (uncredited) as Loc-Nar
 Don Francks as Co-Pilot (Holden)
 George Touliatos as Pilot (Skip)
 Zal Yanovsky as Navigator

Crew
 Barrie Nelson – director
 W. H. Stevens Jr. – producer
 Dan O'Bannon – writer

Music
 "Heavy Metal (Takin' a Ride)" by Don Felder

"So Beautiful & So Dangerous"
Based on the comic of the same name by Angus McKie.

Dr. Anrak, a prominent scientist, arrives at The Pentagon for a meeting regarding mysterious mutations that are plaguing the United States. At the meeting, the doctor tries to dismiss the occurrences. When he sees the Loc-Nar in the locket of Gloria, a beautiful buxom stenographer, he begins to behave erratically and sexually assaults her. A colossal starship drills through the roof and abducts the doctor and, by accident, Gloria. The ship's robot is irritated at Anrak, who is actually a malfunctioning android, but its mood changes when it sees Gloria. With the help of the ship's alien pilot Edsel and co-pilot Zeke, the robot convinces Gloria to stay on board and have "robot sex" (albeit off-screen). Meanwhile, Edsel and Zeke snort a huge amount of a powdered drug called Plutonian Nyborg before flying home, zoning out on the cosmos. Too intoxicated to fly straight, they crash-land unharmed in a huge space station.

Cast
 Percy Rodriguez (uncredited) as Loc-Nar
 Rodger Bumpass as Dr. Anrak
 John Candy as Robot
 Joe Flaherty as General
 Eugene Levy as Male Reporter / Edsel
 Alice Playten as Gloria
 Harold Ramis as Zeke
 Patty Dworkin as Female Reporter
 Warren Munson as Senator

Crew
 John Halas – director
 Angus McKie – writer

Music
 "Queen Bee" by Grand Funk Railroad
 "I Must Be Dreamin'" by Cheap Trick
 "Crazy? (A Suitable Case for Treatment)" by Nazareth
 "All of You" by Don Felder
 "Prefabricated" by Trust
 "Heavy Metal" by Sammy Hagar

"Taarna"
Original story by Daniel Goldberg and Len Blum; based on  Arzach by Moebius.

The Loc-Nar, now the size of a giant meteor, crashes into a volcano on another world and draws a large mass of curious people. As they begin to climb the volcano, it erupts, and green slime covers the crowd, mutating them into an evil barbarian army. The mutants subsequently attack a nearby city of peaceful scholars. Desperate, the city leaders mentally summon the Taarakians, a once powerful yet now declining warrior race with whom the city had a pact, but the city falls before the call can be answered.

Taarna, a beautiful yet mute warrior and the last of the Taarakians, receives the summons; and after ritually preparing herself, she and her avian mount fly to the beleaguered city, only to find the citizens dead. Determined to avenge them, she begins following the trail of their murderers and encounters a small band of the mutant barbarians. After killing them, and with more information at hand, she travels towards the mutant camp, but she and her mount are captured.

Taarna is tortured and thrown into an open pit, unconscious. Her mount escapes and rescues her. She tries going for the Loc-Nar, but the mutants pursue and shoot her mount down. The mutant leader faces Taarna in a duel to the death, wounding her, but Taarna manages to kill him. With the last of their strength, Taarna and her companion make a death flight to the volcano. As they approach, the Loc-Nar warns her off, claiming that sacrificing herself would be futile. Ignoring the Loc-Nar, Taarna unleashes the power imbued in her sword and dives into the volcano, destroying the Loc-Nar.

Cast
 Percy Rodriguez (uncredited) as Loc-Nar
 Thor Bishopric as Boy
 Ned Conlon as Councilman #1
 Len Doncheff as Barbarian #1
 Don Francks as Barbarian #2
 Joseph Golland as Councilman #2
 Charles Joliffe as Councilman #3
 Mavor Moore as Elder
 August Schellenberg as Taarak
 Cedric Smith as Bartender
 George Touliatos as Barbarian #3
 Vlasta Vrána as Barbarian Leader
 Zal Yanovsky as Barbarian #4

Music
 "E5150" by Black Sabbath
 "The Mob Rules" by Black Sabbath
 "Through Being Cool" by Devo

"Epilogue"
As the final story ends, the Loc-Nar that was terrorizing the girl explodes, destroying the mansion in the process. Taarna's reborn mount appears outside, and the girl happily flies away on it.  It is then revealed that Taarna's soul has been reincarnated in the girl, transforming her into a new Taarakian.

Cast
 Percy Rodriguez (uncredited) as Loc-Nar

Closing credits

Music
 "Working in the Coal Mine" by Devo

Production

Animation
Animator Robert Balser directed the animation of the "Den" sequence for the film.

The film uses the rotoscoping technique of animation in several shots. This process consists of shooting models and actors, then tracing the shot onto film for animation purposes. The B-17 bomber was shot using a 10-foot (3 m) replica, which was then animated. Additionally, Taarna the Taarakian was rotoscoped, using Toronto model Carole Desbiens as a model for the animated character. The shot of the exploding house near the end of the movie was originally to be rotoscoped, but as the film's release date had been moved up from October/November to August 7, 1981, a lack of time prevented this. This remains as the only non-animated sequence in the film. During development of this film, the Canadian animation studio, Nelvana Limited, was offered the chance to work on Heavy Metal, but they declined their offer, instead working on their first theatrical film, Rock & Rule.

Fantasy illustrator Chris Achilléos designed and painted the iconic promotional poster image, commissioned in 1980, that features the central character Taarna on her birdlike steed. That artwork continues to be used for home video releases. Achelleos also did conceptual design work for the Taarna character.

Release
The film was released on August 7, 1981. It was a financial success, grossing over $20 million on a $9 million budget.

Reception
The film was met with mixed response. Review aggregator Rotten Tomatoes reports that 66% of critics have given the film a positive review based on 35 reviews, with an average rating of 5.8/10 and the critical consensus: "It's sexist, juvenile, and dated, but Heavy Metal makes up for its flaws with eye-popping animation and a classic, smartly-used soundtrack."

Janet Maslin of The New York Times wrote that "for anyone who doesn't think an hour and a half is a long time to spend with a comic book, Heavy Metal is impressive," and noted that the film "was scored very well, with music much less ear-splitting than the title would suggest." Variety declared, "Initial segments have a boisterous blend of dynamic graphics, intriguing plot premises and sly wit that unfortunately slide gradually downhill ... Still, the net effect is an overridingly positive one and will likely find its way into upbeat word-of-mouth." Gene Siskel of the Chicago Tribune gave the film three stars, writing that it "isn't intended for close scrutiny on a literal level. The film clearly is intended as a trip, and on that level it works very nicely." He criticized the film as "blatantly sexist" and for having "wildly romanticized" violence. Sheila Benson of the Los Angeles Times wrote, "Somehow a great deal of the charm [of the magazine] leaked out on the way to the movie house, but all of the sadism stayed put. And then some. It's the most expensive adolescent fantasy revenge fulfillment wet dream ever to slither onto a screen." John Pym of The Monthly Film Bulletin found that it was "to put it mildly, something of a hodge-podge." Film historian and critic Leonard Maltin gave the film 3 stars out of 4 in his Movie Guide, calling the feature "... uneven, but great fun on a mindless, adolescent level."

On the whole, in terms of individual segments, critics were typically most favorable towards the "Den" story. Critic Janet Maslin gave the film a positive review in The New York Times. She said, "The other highly memorable story is about a bookworm from earth who winds up on another planet, where his spindly body is transformed into that of an extraterrestrial Hercules." She also complimented John Candy's vocal performance as Den.

Christopher John reviewed Heavy Metal in Ares Magazine #11 and commented that "Sadly, what could have been a true boost for animation in this country is a weak, opportunistic failure, put together with very little care and no love at all."

Home media
In 1983, Heavy Metal aired on HBO, then again in 1991.

Prior to official release on VHS and LaserDisc in 1996, the film was re-released to 54 theatres on March 8, 1996, remixed in Sony's 8-track SDDS audio system, taking in $550,000. The subsequent home video release, the first animated film issued on the VHS format to be THX-certified, moved over one million units.

The film was released on Blu-ray Disc on February 1, 2011 as a Best Buy exclusive and it was later released everywhere on June 14.

A remastered 4K version was released on Ultra HD Blu-ray on April 19, 2022, bundled with a Blu-ray Disc release of the sequel, Heavy Metal 2000.

Music

Soundtrack

The soundtrack was released on LP in 1981, but for legal reasons, was not released on CD until 1995. The album peaked at number 12 on the Billboard 200 chart. The film's theme song, "Heavy Metal (Takin' a Ride)" was sung by Don Felder. It was released as a single in the U.S. and reached number 43 on the Billboard Hot 100 and number five on the Mainstream Rock chart on September 19, 1981.

Blue Öyster Cult wrote and recorded a song called "Vengeance (The Pact)" for the film, but the producers declined to use the song because the lyrics provided a capsulized summary of the "Taarna" vignette. "Veteran of the Psychic Wars" was used instead. Both songs can be found on Blue Öyster Cult's album Fire of Unknown Origin. Though used in the film, the songs "Through Being Cool" by Devo and "E5150" by Black Sabbath were not included in the released soundtrack album. These songs are on New Traditionalists and Mob Rules, respectively.

The legal difficulties surrounding the use of some songs in the film delayed its release to home media. The production company's use of some songs was limited solely to the theatrical release and soundtrack and did not include home media releases. It was not until 1996 that there was an official home media release on VHS when Kevin Eastman, who had bought the publishing rights of Heavy Metal magazine in 1992 and previously contributed to the magazine, reached a settlement with the music copyright holders.

Original LP contained four tracks per side and was programmed in stackable order (A, D, B, C).

Rhino Records reissued the two-LP collection in 2017, programmed in standard order (A, B, C, D), as part of their "Rocktober" collection.

Charts

Certifications

Score
Unusual for the time, an LP recording of Elmer Bernstein's score was released alongside the soundtrack in 1981, and it featured the composer's first use of the ondes Martenot, an instrument which became a trademark of Bernstein's later career. On March 13, 2008, Film Score Monthly released an official, expanded CD release of Bernstein's score, which he conducted. The score was performed by the Royal Philharmonic Orchestra with the London Voices and Jeanne Loriod on the ondes Martenot.

Original track listing:
 "Den and the Green Ball" (03:17)
 "Den Makes It" (02:49)
 "Den and the Queen" (02:56)
 "Den's Heroics" (02:52)
 "Bomber and the Green Ball" (04:41)
 "Space Love" (01:32)
 "Harry and the Girl" (03:45)
 "Tarna Summoned" (sic) (02:50)
 "Flight" (02:20)
 "Tarna Prepares" (sic) (03:35)
 "Barbarians" (03:37)
 "Tarna Forever" (sic) (03:37)

Re-release track listing:
 "Beginning" 1:16
 "Intro to Green Ball" 1:18
 "Discovery/Transformation (Den and the Green Ball)" 3:15
 "Den Makes Out (Den Makes It)" 2:42
 "Castrate Him/Searching for the Loc-Nar" 2:04
 "Queen for a Day (Den and the Queen)" 2:54
 "Pursuit (Den’s Heroics)" 2:51
 "Fiste" 1:27
 "Getting Bombed" 3:06
 "Green Ball" 2:15
 "Dem Bones" 2:44
 "No Alarm" 0:58
 "Robot Love (Space Love)" 1:32
 "Harry" 1:35
 "The Next Morning" 1:56
 "End of Baby" 2:43
 "Council (Taarna Summoned)" 2:49
 "The Flight to Temple (Flight)" 2:16
 "The Sword (Taarna Prepares)" 3:32
 "Flight to Holiday Town" 2:20
 "Fighting" 2:43
 "My Whips!/Taarna Escapes Pit" 4:57
 "Finish (Taarna Forever)" 3:34

Bonus tracks
 "Den Makes Out" (film version) 2:49
 "Bomber and the Green Ball" (album edit) 4:35
 "Harry and the Girl" (album edit) 3:41
 "Barbarians" (album edit) 3:34

Sequel
The sequel, titled Heavy Metal 2000, was released in 2000.

Remake
In March 2008, Variety reported that Paramount Pictures was set to make another animated film with David Fincher "spearheading the project". Kevin Eastman, who is the current owner and publisher of Heavy Metal, will direct a segment, as will Tim Miller, "whose Blur Studio will handle the animation for what is being conceived as an R-rated, adult-themed feature".

Entertainment website IGN announced, on July 14, 2008, "David Fincher's edgy new project has suffered a serious setback after it was dropped by Paramount, according to Entertainment Weekly." Entertainment Weekly quoted Tim Miller as saying "David really believes in the project. It's just a matter of time."

In September 2008, Eastman was quoted as saying "Fincher is directing one, Guillermo del Toro wants to direct one, Zack Snyder wants to direct one, Gore Verbinski wants to direct one". It was reported that the film had been moved to Sony division Columbia Pictures (which had released the original) and had a budget of $50 million.

In June 2009, Eastman said "I've got breaking news that Fincher and James Cameron are going to be co-executive producers on the film, Cameron will direct one. Mark Osborne and Jack Black from Tenacious D were going to do a comedy segment for the film."

Production is stalled indefinitely, as no film distributor or production company has shown interest in distributing or producing the remake since Paramount Pictures decided to forgo being the film's distributor, who purportedly thought such a film was "too risqué for mainstream audiences".

In July 2011, filmmaker Robert Rodriguez announced at the Comic-Con that he had purchased the film rights to Heavy Metal and planned to develop a new animated film at the new Quick Draw Studios. On March 11, 2014, with the formation of his very own television network, El Rey, Rodriguez considered switching gears and bringing it to TV.

On March 15, 2019, the reboot was released on Netflix as a reimagining titled Love, Death & Robots.

References

External links

 
 
 
 
 
 
 Heavy Metal score soundtrack questions, answers and more @ the SoundtrackINFO project
 Fan site providing detailed history of the film, its relationships to the original graphic novel stories, reviews, etc

Heavy Metal (magazine) films
1981 films
1981 animated films
1980s fantasy adventure films
1980s science fiction adventure films
Canadian adult animated films
Canadian animated science fiction films
Canadian animated fantasy films
Canadian erotic films
Canadian animated feature films
1980s English-language films
Animated action films
Animated adventure films
Canadian anthology films
Rotoscoped films
American dark fantasy films
Canadian fantasy adventure films
Films scored by Elmer Bernstein
Films about drugs
Films about sexuality
Films based on short fiction
Films directed by Gerald Potterton
Films produced by Ivan Reitman
Film controversies
Canadian independent films
Science fantasy films
Columbia Pictures animated films
Columbia Pictures films
1980s American animated films
American erotic films
Animated films based on comics
Animated films about extraterrestrial life
Fantasy anthology films
Films with screenplays by Dan O'Bannon
Obscenity controversies in animation
Obscenity controversies in film
English-language Canadian films
Animated anthology films
1980s Canadian films
Sword and planet films